Purple Records was a record label established in 1971 by Deep Purple's management. Their releases were distributed by EMI and now by Universal Music Group after the EMI acquisition. The label was run until 1979. Until 1974 the label was used for Deep Purple releases, band members' solo work and releases by other artists signed to the label. From 1974 a decision was made to release only Deep Purple and members' solo work on the imprint and a subsidiary label, Oyster, was established for other work (including that of ex-band members such as Ian Gillan and Ritchie Blackmore and their new projects, the Ian Gillan Band and Ritchie Blackmore's Rainbow). In 1997 Simon Robinson, from RPM Records, established a second label, releasing rare and previously unissued recordings. Although Universal continues to use the original logo, Robinson designed a new logo for his label.

1971-1979 released artists
Deep Purple
David Coverdale
Jon Lord
Roger Glover & Friends
Tony Ashton
Hard Stuff
Rupert Hine
The Bumbles
Silverhead
Jon Pertwee
Yvonne Elliman
Carol Hunter
Michael Des Barres
Tucky Buzzard
Curtiss Maldoon
Gnasher
Elf
Marlon

See also
 List of record labels

External links
 
purplerecords.net Website by the related label established by Simon Robinson in 1997
Purple Records  2017 Korean founded the hip-hop R&B genre label.

British record labels
1971 establishments in the United Kingdom
1979 disestablishments in the United Kingdom
Record labels established in 1971
Record labels disestablished in 1979
Pop record labels
Rock record labels
Deep Purple
EMI
Vanity record labels